Laura Herrera Alonso (born 26 July 2003) is a Mexican footballer who plays for Pumas in Liga MX Femenil.

Club career

In 2019, Herrera signed with Pumas. She made her Liga MX Femenil debut in August 2019.

In February 2022, she tore a cruciate ligament in her left knee.

References

External links 
 

2003 births
Living people
Mexican women's footballers
Footballers from Mexico City
Women's association football midfielders
Club Universidad Nacional (women) footballers
Liga MX Femenil players
21st-century Mexican women
Mexican footballers